Oh! Look at Me Now is an album by American singer Bobby Darin, released in 1962. It was his first on Capitol label and reached number 100 on the Billboard 200. It is out of print, however eight of the 12 songs were released as part of the 1995 CD Spotlight on Bobby Darin.

Reception

In his Allmusic review, critic JT Griffith wrote "The classic Billy May arrangements make the album one of Darin's most swinging albums and a surefire favorite with fans who have discovered him from the Swingers soundtrack."

Track listing
"All by Myself" (Irving Berlin) – 3:05
"My Buddy" (Walter Donaldson, Gus Kahn) – 2:34
"There's a Rainbow 'Round My Shoulder" (Al Jolson, Dave Dreyer, Billy Rose) – 2:40
"Roses of Picardy" (Frederick Weatherly, Haydn Wood) – 2:11
"You'll Never Know" (Harry Warren, Mack Gordon) – 2:55
"Blue Skies" (Berlin) – 2:32
"Always" (Berlin) – 2:21
"You Made Me Love You" (James V. Monaco, Joseph McCarthy) – 2:51
"A Nightingale Sang in Berkeley Square" (Eric Maschwitz, Manning Sherwin) – 3:02
"I'm Beginning to See the Light" (Duke Ellington, Don George, Johnny Hodges, Harry James) – 2:18
"Oh! Look at Me Now" (Joe Bushkin, John DeVries) – 2:43
"The Party's Over" (Jule Styne, Betty Comden, Adolph Green) – 2:26

Personnel
Bobby Darin – vocals
Billy May – arranger, conductor
Tom Morgan – producer

References

1962 albums
Bobby Darin albums
Capitol Records albums
Albums arranged by Billy May
Albums conducted by Billy May